Jenny Saffran is a Professor of Psychology at the University of Wisconsin, Madison.  She specializes in language acquisition and early cognitive development, and she also conducts research on music cognition.  Saffran views language acquisition as based on general cognitive processes such as statistical learning, and has conducted numerous empirical studies that support this view.  She received a B.A. from Brown University and a Ph.D. from the University of Rochester.  Saffran is married to fellow psychologist Seth Pollak, and she is the daughter of cognitive neuropsychologist Eleanor Saffran.

References

External links
Jenny Saffran's Homepage
Infant Learning Lab

American women psychologists
American cognitive scientists
Women cognitive scientists
Developmental psycholinguists
University of Rochester alumni
Brown University alumni
University of Wisconsin–Madison faculty
Year of birth missing (living people)
Living people
American women academics
21st-century American women